Christmas Songs is a 1992 studio album by the American jazz singer Mel Tormé.

Track listing 
 Christmas Medley: "Jingle Bells"/"Santa Claus Is Coming to Town"/"Winter Weather"/"Winter Wonderland" (James Lord Pierpont)/(John Frederick Coots, Haven Gillespie)/(Ted Shapiro)/(Felix Bernard, Richard B. Smith) - 4:16
 "Sleigh Ride" (Leroy Anderson) - 2:30
 "The Christmas Song" (Mel Tormé, Bob Wells) - 3:18
 "The Glow Worm" (Paul Lincke, Johnny Mercer, Lilla C. Robinson) - 3:24
 "The Christmas Feeling" (Tormé) - 5:12
 "It Happened in Sun Valley" (Mack Gordon, Harry Warren) - 2:58
 "Christmas Time Is Here" (Vince Guaraldi, Lee Mendelson) - 3:49
 "Good King Wenceslas" (John Mason Neale) - 4:11
 "What Child Is This?" (William Chatterton Dix), (Traditional) - 3:39
 "Silver Bells" (Ray Evans, Jay Livingston) - 5:21
 "Christmas Was Made for Children" (Tormé) - 3:48
 "The Christmas Waltz" (Sammy Cahn, Jule Styne) - 5:03
 Medley: "Just Look Around"/"Have Yourself a Merry Little Christmas" (Tormé)/(Ralph Blane, Hugh Martin) - 3:51
 "God Rest Ye Merry Gentlemen" (Traditional) - 1:39
 Medley: "Happy Holiday"/"Let's Start the New Year Right"/"What Are You Doing New Year's Eve?" (Irving Berlin)/(Frank Loesser) - 3:25
 "White Christmas" (Berlin) - 3:58

Personnel 
 Mel Tormé - vocals, drums, arranger
 Keith Lockhart - conductor
 John Walsh - trumpet
 Ross Konikoff
 Frank London
 Bob Milikan
 Tom Artin - trombone
 Rich Willey
 Adam Brenner - clarinet, alto saxophone
 Jeff Rupert - clarinet, tenor saxophone
 Larry Dickson - bass clarinet, baritone saxophone
 Jack Stuckey - clarinet, flute, alto saxophone
 Jerry Weldon - clarinet, tenor saxophone
 John Leitham - double bass
 John Colianni - piano
 Donny Osborne - drums
 Angela Morley - arranger
 Robert Woods - Recording Producer
 Jack Renner - Recording Engineer
 Michael Bishop - Recording, Mix, and Mastering Engineer
 Erica Brenner - Associate Recording Producer, Editor

References 

1992 Christmas albums
Christmas albums by American artists
Mel Tormé albums
Telarc Records albums
Jazz Christmas albums